Constitution Day (or Citizenship Day), is an American federal observance that recognizes the adoption of the United States Constitution and those who have become U.S. citizens. It is normally observed on September 17, the day in 1787 that delegates to the Constitutional Convention signed the document in Philadelphia.

When Constitution Day falls on a weekend or on another holiday, schools and other institutions observe the holiday on an adjacent weekday.

The law establishing the present holiday was created in 2004 with the passage of an amendment by Senator Robert Byrd to the Omnibus spending bill of 2004. Before this law was enacted, the holiday was known as "Citizenship Day" and celebrated on the third Sunday in May. In addition to renaming the holiday "Constitution Day and Citizenship Day," the act mandates that all publicly funded educational institutions, and all federal agencies, provide educational programming on the history of the American Constitution on that day. In May 2005, the United States Department of Education announced the enactment of this law and that it would apply to any school receiving federal funds of any kind.

History

Origins
Iowa schools first recognized Constitution Day in 1911. In 1917, the Sons of the American Revolution formed a committee to promote Constitution Day.  The committee included members such as Calvin Coolidge, John D. Rockefeller, and General John Pershing.

I am an American Day
This day was inspired by Arthur Pine, the head of a publicity-public relations firm in New York City bearing his name.  At the New York World's Fair, the writers of a new song called "I am an American" brought their manuscript to the attention of Arthur Pine who handled publicity for the band leader, Gray Gordon, and a music publisher.  Arthur Pine had the song introduced on NBC, Mutual, and ABC by the orchestra leader, arranged for an "I am an American Day" at the 1939 New York World's Fair, and had a local New York newspaper tie-in with "I am an American Day" in the city. The promotion proved so successful that a newspaper chain promoted "I am an American Day" on a nationwide basis and had President Roosevelt name it as an official day.

In 1939, William Randolph Hearst advocated, through his chain of daily newspapers, the creation of a holiday to celebrate citizenship. In 1940, Congress designated the third Sunday in May as "I am an American Day." In 1944 "I am an American Day" was promoted through the United States Immigration and Naturalization Service. A 16-minute film, I Am an American, was featured in American theaters as a short feature. In 1947 Hearst Newsreels featured the event on News of the Day. By 1949, governors of all 48 states had issued Constitution Day proclamations. On February 29, 1952, Congress moved the "I am an American Day" observation to September 17 and renamed it "Citizenship Day".

Louisville, Ohio – the Constitution Town
Louisville, Ohio, calls itself "Constitution Town", and credits one of its own for getting the holiday national recognition. In 1952, resident Olga T. Weber petitioned municipal officials to establish Constitution Day, in honor of the creation of the US Constitution in 1787. Mayor Gerald A. Romary proclaimed September 17, 1952, as Constitution Day in the city. The following April, Weber requested that the Ohio General Assembly proclaim September 17 as statewide Constitution Day. Her request was signed into law by Governor Frank J. Lausche. In August 1953, she took her case to the United States Senate, which passed a resolution designating September 17–23 as Constitution Week. The Senate and House approved her request and it was signed into law by President Dwight D. Eisenhower. On April 15, 1957, the City Council of Louisville declared the city Constitution Town. The Ohio State Archaeological and Historical Society later donated four historical markers, located at the four main entrances to the city, explaining Louisville's role as originator of Constitution Day.

First U.S. Congressional designation of Citizenship Day 

Mrs. A.B. (Clara) Vajda, a Hungarian immigrant to the United States, was recognized in the U.S. Congressional Record as the Founder of Citizenship Day on March 27, 1941.  In his remarks, Rep. Wasielewski noted "...on May 3, 1940, the President of the United States approved a joint resolution of both Houses of Congress, setting aside the third Sunday of May of each year as Citizenship Day.  The purpose of this Act was to give recognition to all those who, by coming of age or naturalization, have attained the status of citizenship...I wonder how many people in this country really know the true story of the origin of this day.  I wonder how many people know that a simple act of charity of a foreign-born citizen was the motivating spark which has set in motion this movement to teach all citizens to appreciate the great honor and privilege which has been bestowed upon them when they assume their sovereign rights of citizenship."

Observances
President Donald Trump reaffirmed on September 17, 2017, as Constitution Day and  Citizenship Day.

See also
 Constitution Day (other countries)
 Founding Fathers of the United States
 Holidays of the United States

References

Further reading
 Haverty-Stacke, Donna T. (2009). "World War II and Public Reflections of Americanism'". America's Forgotten Holiday: May Day and Nationalism, 1867–1960. New York: New York University. pp. 182–192.

External links

 Explore quizzes, videos, games, and lessons for Constitution Day
 NEH Constitution Day Portal
 U.S. Constitution & Citizenship Week at MSOE
 Multiple related links on the U.S. Constitution and history of the United States from MSOE
 Federal Register announcement
 Constitution Day resources for educators, federal employees, individuals, and parents
 National Archives
 National Constitution Center
 The text of US CODE Title 36 § 106, describing Constitution Day and Citizenship Day – Hosted by Cornell University Law School
 The text of 36 USC 106, describing Citizenship Day – Hosted by FindLaw.  Shows January 1994 US Code prior to amendment adding Constitution Day to this observance.
 The text of H.R. 4818, adding Constitution Day and specifying educational requirements
 Constitution Day History – Hosted by FairVote – Center for Voting and Democracy
 US declaration font unique font type based on United States Declaration of Independence

Online lessons for K-12 teachers to use on Constitution Day
 Constitution Day Brought to You By The ACLU, Resources for Parents and Educators
 Free quizzes, videos, and games for Constitution Day
 Free Constitution Day resources for educators
 Searchable, user-rated Constitution Day resources for educators
 Education World Constitution Day Lesson Planning – List of best web resources and links to online lessons
 EDSITEment Constitution Day Lesson Plans and Resources
 CRF Constitution Day Lesson Plans – Free downloadable lessons for K-12 educators to plan and implement celebration events.

Public holidays in the United States
United States flag flying days
September observances
United States
Drafting of the United States Constitution
Fall events in the United States